Bellandi is a surname of Italian origin. Notable people with the surname include:

 Ernesto Bellandi (1842–1916), Italian painter
 Giovanni Battista Bellandi (early 16th century), Italian sculptor
 Nazario Carlo Bellandi (1919–2010), Italian music composer, organist, pianist and harpsichordist

Italian-language surnames

it:Bellandi